Sedad Hakkı Eldem (1908 in Constantinople – 7 September 1988, in Istanbul), was a Turkish architect and one of the pioneers of nationalized modern architecture in Turkey.

Biography

Eldem was born in Istanbul in 1908. He graduated from the Academy of Fine Arts department of Architecture. Between 1931 and 1932 he travelled to France, England and Germany with a scholarship from the academy. In 1932 he opened his own office and started teaching at the Academy of Fine Arts, which he continued until his retirement in 1978. In 1934 he worked for the National Architecture Seminar in Turkey, which was disaster for him, because of the discussions between modern architecture and traditional architecture. In 1938 he designed the Turkish Pavilion in New York Exhibition. Eldem represented the Turkish Republic at the International Union of Architects in Lozan (1948) after the Second World War. The same year, Eldem also worked with his colleague Emin Onat on the project of Istanbul Justice Palace.
He worked on the proportions and architectural organization of Ottoman domestic houses, 18th and 19th century palaces and mansions. He was known as a role model and pioneer of reinterpreting classical Ottoman patterns in modern architecture. He was a part of the Former Artifacts Maintain Council (Eski Eserleri Muhafaza Encümeni) between 1941 and 1945 and also a part of the Supreme Council of Antiquities and Monument Real Estate (Gayrimenkul Eski Eserler ve Anıtlar Yüksek Kurulu) between 1962 and 1978.

His goal was to nationalize modern architecture. He believed that International Style in architecture should not be applied everywhere and that some aspects should be changed by considering the national and domestic texture.

He won the international Aga Khan Award for Architecture in 1986 with the project of Zeyrek Social Security Facilities.

He died on 7 September 1988 in Istanbul.

Architecture

Eldem's architecture essentially has four main periods. The first of them, between 1928 and 1934, is known for the instability of his work. After that, the second period is popular with modern trials on Ottoman architectural organization. The time frame of this period spans from 1934 until 1952. The third period of his architecture, from 1952 to 1962, has lost its Ottoman influence and looks more modernized. The last era of Eldem's architecture is known for his double approach on projects. This final period started in 1962, and lasted until his death in 1988.

 The years between 1928 and 1934 are defined as preparation years for Eldem. During these years the architect worked in Istanbul, Paris and Berlin but there is no remaining architecture. The only structure that has been built in that period is a temporary Turkish pavilion in Budapest Exhibition in 1931. This structure gives us few clues about his searching in architecture. While Eldem had tried almost every approach popular in these years, he also tried to combine them even if they were all contradictory. He even give parts to different architectural elements in one design. For example, one of his trials in Paris, embassy project has Auguste Perret impressions in details, its planimetry has traditional middle "sofa" and "Eyvan" types of components that usually belong to Turkish architecture. The architect was also inspired by a scheme peculiar to Iran and the Middle East, named Cihar-bağ. At the same time he studied the styles of Art Deco, Le Corbusier, Hoffmann, Olbrich, Tessenow and Webb. Despite this and his instability of style, he never abandoned his research into traditional and domestic Ottoman civil architecture. He made use of all styles as much as they compromise with traditional architecture. Styles that do not overlap with domestic architecture were not used.
 Returning from Europe to Istanbul did not affect Eldem's instability about architectural style. His first examples in Istanbul show different elements. Ceylan Apartment (1933) has traits of Art Deco, S.A.T.İ.E. Store and Administration Building (1934) has features of International Style, while Firdevs Hanım House (1934) has elements of Le Corbusier. However all of the imaginary projects in Europe give their places to realistic projects in Istanbul even if they are not built. Instead of large, fancy mansions, at that time there were modest houses and buildings published in the journal Arkitekt.
 The instability period of the architect ends with his Yalova Thermal Hotel (1934–1937) and Ağaoğlu House (1936–1937) projects. These projects also mark the beginning of a new era of Eldem's architecture. He started to become well-known in Turkey for his architecture and approach to modern architecture. Yalova Thermal Hotel was the first nationalized modern work in Turkey. In these years, there was discussion about interpretation in modern architecture. Eldem was one of the pioneers of defending the idea of nationalized modern architecture.
 From 1934 to 1952 Eldem worked on some trials on traditional Ottoman houses' plan organizations and exterior elements in more modernized ways. These works are connected with his historiographical research. Eventually he tried to "invent the tradition" in modern aspects of his time. Some of his projects had have strong connections between international style and domestic tradition; on the other hand, traditional Turkish elements stay in the background just for being a little touches. For example, Taşlık Coffee House (1947–1948) was designed with T-shaped plan which is a traditional scheme, and international view kept in minimum. However, Admiral Bristol Hospital and Nursing House (1943) only looks national from the outside, whereas the faculty buildings of Ankara University (1943–1945) and Istanbul University (1942–1947) were inspired by Nazi Germany. The Turkish part of these mass buildings is hidden in the details.
 Between 1952 and 1962 Eldem's architecture kept Ottoman civil architectural characteristics at a minimum. Florya Facilities (1955–1959) and Rıza Derviş House (1956–1957) were built with more likely rationalized modernist style. Also that impact known by the name of "California modern". Hilton Hotel's (1952–1955) design shows us almost nothing about Eldem's architecture. In that process the hotel owes its standard American view to SOM despite Eldem. Second Safyurtlu House (1952) is a successful example of American flort.
 The years after 1960 were known as Eldem's and the Republic of Turkey's leaping and changing years. The architect has two different approaches in these years. The first is heroic and monumental, moving away from a traditional and domestic perspective, like the Akbank Administration Building and Ayazağa Office Buildings. The other approach looks more like Eldem's: eclectic and different trials on Ottoman civil architecture give their places to a vocabulary that Eldem's own. For example, a horizontal roof line, wide canopies, and well-proportioned windows and cantilevers are features used in the designs of Zeyrek Social Security Facilities (1962–1964), India Embassy Residence (1965–1968), Kıraç Mansion (1965), Sirer Mansion (1966–1967) etc.

List of significant works
 First period of his architecture (1928–1934)
 1931: Turkish Pavilion in Budapest Exhibition, Budapest
 1932: Ceylan Apartment in Taksim, Istanbul
 1932: S.A.T.İ.E. Store and Administration Building in Fındıklı, Istanbul
 1934: Firdevs Hanım Apartment in Maçka, Istanbul
 1934: Thermal Hotel in Yalova
 1936: Ağaoğlu House in Teşvikiye, Istanbul
 Second period of his architecture (1934–1952)
 1938: Ayaşlı Mansion in Beylerbeyi, Istanbul
 1942: Safyurtlu Villa in Beşevler, Ankara
 1942: Istanbul University, Faculty of Science in Beyazit, Istanbul
 1943: Ankara University, Faculty of Science in Beşeveler, Ankara
 1943: Admiral Bristol Hospital and Nursing House in Teşvikiye, Istanbul
 1947: Taşlık Coffee House in Maçka, Istanbul
 Third period of his architecture (1952–1962)
 1952: Second Safyurtlu House in Yeniköy, Istanbul
 1955: Florya Facilities in Florya, Istanbul
 1956: Rıza Derviş House in Büyükada, Istanbul
 1956: Uşaklıgil House in Emirgan, Istanbul
 Fourth period of his architecture (1962–and after)
 1960: India Embassy Residence in Cinnah Street, Ankara
 1962: Social Security Facilities in Zeyrek, Istanbul
 1964: Siner Mansion in Yeniköy, Istanbul
 1965: Kıraç Mansion in Vaniköy, Istanbul
 1966: Akbank Administration Building in Fındıklı, Istanbul
 1973: Netherlands Embassy in Ankara
 1975: Koç House in Tarabya, Istanbul

References

 Sibel Bozdogan, Suha Ozkan and Engin Yenal, Sedat Hakki Eldem: Architect in Turkey, Singapore: Concept Media Ltd./Aga Khan Trust for Culture, 1987.
 Edhem Eldem, Uğur Tanyeli, Bülent Tanju, (2008), Sedad Hakkı Eldem I: Gençlik Yılları, Osmanlı Bankası Arşiv ve Araştırma Merkezi, 
 Uğur Tanyeli, Bülent Tanju, (2009), Sedad Hakkı Eldem II: Retrospektif, Osmanlı Bankası Arşiv ve Araştırma Merkezi, 
 Uğur Tanyeli, (2007), Sedad Hakkı Eldem, Boyut Press Group, 
 TIMMOB Chamber of Architects, (2010), 100 Yıl'da İki Mimar, 

1908 births
1988 deaths
20th-century Turkish architects